Michael Brian Kennerty (born July 20, 1980) is an American musician and record producer. He is best known as the rhythm guitarist for The All-American Rejects, as well as playing guitar for Screeching Weasel. As a producer he has worked with such artists as Masked Intruder, Direct Hit, Screeching Weasel, The Copyrights, and Red City Radio. He lives in Edmond, Oklahoma, where his studio is also located.

Discography

Production

Performer

with The All-American Rejects 

 Move Along (2005, Interscope)
 When the World Comes Down (2008, Interscope)
 Kids in the Street (2012, Interscope)
Sweat (2017, Interscope)
Send Her To Heaven (2019, Epitaph)

Other 

 Screeching Weasel - Baby Fat Act 1 (2015, Recess Records)
 Screeching Weasel - The Awful Disclosures of Screeching Weasel (2022, Striped Music)
 Ben Weasel - These Ones Are Bitter (2007, Asian Man Records)
 These Enzymes - Henry (2004, Doghouse Records)
 Euclid Crash - FMO (2002)
 Mr. Crispy - Hopes and Schemes (2000, Mutant Pop Records)
 Mr. Crispy - End of the Week (1999)
 Mr. Crispy / Peter the Great split (1998)
 Mr. Crispy - Drug Free and Regretting It (1998)
He also often does additional performance on the records he produces.

References

1980 births
Living people
American rock guitarists
Record producers from Oklahoma
People from Edmond, Oklahoma
Rhythm guitarists
21st-century guitarists
21st-century American male musicians